William Dennis Homewood (17 March 1920 – 13 January 1989) was a British Labour Party politician.

Homewood was Member of Parliament for Kettering from 1979 to 1983.  After the boundary changes of that year, he stood in Corby, but lost to the Conservative candidate William Powell. He died in Market Harborough aged 68.

References
Times Guide to the House of Commons 1983

External links 
 

1920 births
1989 deaths
Iron and Steel Trades Confederation-sponsored MPs
Labour Party (UK) MPs for English constituencies
UK MPs 1979–1983